is a railway station in the city of Ishinomaki, Miyagi Prefecture, Japan, operated by East Japan Railway Company (JR East).

Lines
Sawada Station is served by the Ishinomaki Line, and is located 38.3 kilometers from the terminus of the line at Kogota Station.

Station layout
The station has one side platform, serving a single bi-directional track. The station is unattended and there is no station building.

History
Sawada Station opened on October 7, 1939. The station was absorbed into the JR East network upon the privatization of Japanese National Railways (JNR) on April 1, 1987. Operations of the line and the station were suspended by the 2011 Tōhoku earthquake and tsunami of March 11, 2011. Services were resumed on March 16, 2013; but remained suspended on the portion from Urashuku to Onagawa until August 6, 2016.

Adjacent stations 
 JR East
 Ishinomaki Line・Senseki-Tohoku Line
 Rapid・Local
  - Sta.Sawada -

Surrounding area

Mangokuura Port

See also
 List of railway stations in Japan

External links

 

Railway stations in Miyagi Prefecture
Ishinomaki Line
Railway stations in Japan opened in 1939
Ishinomaki
Stations of East Japan Railway Company